the 2011 Census of India, there are 147 villages under Nakodar tehsil, a subdivision of Jalandhar district, in Punjab, India.

References 

Nakodar tehsil